Lorado is an unincorporated community in Logan County, West Virginia, United States. Lorado has a post office with ZIP code 25630.

The community's name is an acronym of the Lorain Coal and Dock Company.

References

Unincorporated communities in Logan County, West Virginia
Unincorporated communities in West Virginia
Coal towns in West Virginia